Joni Van Ryck De Groot (born 17 October 1955) is a Jamaican former professional tennis player.

Playing for Jamaica at the Fed Cup, Van Ryck De Groot has accumulated a win–loss record of 7–34.

Career finals

Doubles: 2 (2–0)

References

1955 births
Living people
Jamaican female tennis players
Jamaican sportswomen

External links